Waldemar Leitgeb (1901 – 1974) was a Turkish-born German stage actor and director. He also appeared in a number of films such including Sky Hounds.

Selected filmography
The Green Domino (1935)
 Tango Notturno (1937)
 A Prussian Love Story (1938)
 The Rothschilds (1940)
 Sky Hounds (1942)
 Münchhausen (1943)
 Dunja (1955)

References

Bibliography
 Richards, Jeffrey. Visions of Yesterday. Routledge & Kegan Paul, 1973.

External links

1901 births
1974 deaths
German male film actors
German male stage actors
Male actors from Istanbul
German expatriates in the Ottoman Empire